Scott Wisemantel (born 1970), is an Australian former dual code rugby player and current coach, who played rugby union for Eastwood Rugby Club and rugby league for the Parramatta Eels. He is currently assistant coaching the Australian national rugby union team.

Playing career 

 1988–1992 : Parramatta Eels (Rugby league Club)
 1992–1999 : Eastwood Rugby Club (Rugby Union Club), playing at fly half.

Career coach 

 1999–2000 : Japan Toyota Verblitz (backs coach)
 2001–2002 : Australia NSW Waratahs (skills)
 2002–2003 : France AS Montferrand (backs coach)
 2004–2005 : Australia Under 19 National Team (head coach)
 2004–2007 : Australia (skills)
 2009–2010 : Australia NSW Waratahs (backs coach)
 2011 : Manu Samoa Specialist Coach World Cup 
 2012–2013 : Japan National Team (backs coach)
 November 2013 : Japan National Team (interim head coach)
 2014–2015 : France Lyon OU (backs coach)
 2015 : Japan (working with Eddie Jones at the World Cup)
 2015 – 2018 : France Montpellier Hérault Rugby (assistant coach and backs coach, alongside club manager Jake White and forwards coach Shaun Sowerby)
 2016 : Australia XV (head coach v French Barbarians)
 2018 : England Rugby (attack consultant on the South Africa tour, subsequently extended.)
2020 : Australia (attack consultant)

When Wisemantel was coaching the Waratahs, he introduced the idea of his back three all working as full backs.

Honors
Rugby World Cup 2003
Runner-up: 2003

References

Australian rugby union coaches
Japan national rugby team coaches
Australian rugby union players
Australian rugby league players
1970 births
Living people
Parramatta Eels players
Rugby union fly-halves
Samoa national rugby union team coaches
Australian expatriate sportspeople in Japan
Australian expatriate sportspeople in Samoa
Australian expatriate sportspeople in France
Australian expatriate sportspeople in England